Russula maculata is a species of mushroom in the genus Russula.

References

External links

maculata
Fungi described in 1878
Fungi of Europe